Hans Moke Niemann (born June 20, 2003) is an American chess grandmaster and Twitch streamer. He was awarded the Grandmaster title by FIDE on January 22, 2021. In July 2021, he won the World Open chess tournament in Philadelphia. Niemann first entered the Top 100 Junior players list at position 88 on March 1, 2019. As of February 2023, he is the fourth-highest-rated Junior in the world and 35th overall. 

Niemann is currently embroiled in an ongoing cheating controversy that began after he defeated world champion Magnus Carlsen in the third round of the 2022 Sinquefield Cup. Carlsen initially made no direct accusation, but did post a cryptic tweet, which together with ramped-up security measures in the fourth round implied an accusation of cheating. Niemann admitted to cheating in online chess twice, when he was 12 and 16 years old, but denied cheating over the board. Carlsen eventually accused Niemann of cheating in a statement on September 26. Later, Chess.com published an article called "The Hans Niemann Report" which stated that Niemann has likely cheated in more than 100 games on the website, of which some were prized events. In response, Niemann filed a $100 million defamation lawsuit against Magnus Carlsen, Chess.com and Hikaru Nakamura.

Early life and education 
Niemann was born in San Francisco, California, and is of mixed Hawaiian and Danish ancestry. Before moving to the Netherlands at the age of 7, he attended Top of the World Elementary School in Laguna Beach, California. While attending a  gifted school in Utrecht, the Netherlands, Niemann began playing chess at 8 years old. After moving back to California at 10 years old, he finished his elementary school education at Del Rey Elementary School in Orinda.

He graduated from Columbia Grammar & Preparatory School, which is known for its chess culture, in New York City after moving there in 2019. He previously lived in Weston, Connecticut, where he attended Weston High School.

Chess career 

John Grefe was one of Niemann's coaches.

Niemann qualified for the Dutch National Youth Chess Championship in 2012.

A self-taught player, Niemann rose from an Elo rating of around 2450 to 2650 in just over three years after returning to the US. Niemann first competed in a rated US tournament in December 2012. Just under four months later he participated in the 2013 SuperNationals V in Nashville with a rating of 2486, scoring 4/7.

2014 
In March 2014, Niemann's rating was just under 2000 at 10 years old, which allowed him to get an invitation to his first U.S. Chess School camp in St. Louis with coaches Greg Shahade and John Bartholomew.

On December 16, 2014, Niemann became the youngest-ever winner of the Mechanics’ Institute Chess Club Tuesday Night Marathon, the oldest chess club in the United States, earning him the title of USCF Master.

Niemann competed at the 2014 World Youth Chess Championships held in Durban, South Africa, in the U12 category, winning 6 of his 11 games. Earlier that year he lost against Annie Wang at the National Junior Chess Congress in Irvine, which made Wang at the time the youngest FIDE Master, breaking an 18-year-old record.

2015 
At the 2015 National Open of the Las Vegas International Chess Festival, then 11-year-old Niemann became the last person to play a rated game against GM Walter Browne, who died shortly after competing in the tournament. Browne won the game after 35 moves.

2016 
Niemann has been part of the US Chess Federations All-America Chess Team since 2016.

After becoming an FM in early 2016, he competed at the 2016 Saint Louis Invitational IM Norm, Niemann was among the youngest players competing along with Carissa Yip.

At the 2016 North American Youth Championship, Niemann tied for first place in the U18 category and earned his first IM norm.

2017 
At the 2017 SuperNationals VI, Niemann, with a rating of 2412, entered the tournament as the top seed and finished 1st in his K–8 category.

2018 
In August 2018, Niemann competed at the 2018 U.S. Masters Championship, earning his second IM norm and also his first GM norm.

Later in August 2018, Niemann earned his 3rd and final IM norm at the Cambridge IM Norm Invitational and met all the requirements for the title of International Master.

In December 2018, he won the National K–12 Blitz Championships undefeated, finishing 12–0. Three days later, he went on to tie for 1st in his grade in the overall K–12 Grade Championships, while also tying for first in the bughouse duo, achieving a perfect win.

After initially winning his first six consecutive games, Niemann finished in third place at the 2018 U16 Olympiad in Konya, Turkey.

2019 
In June 2019, Niemann won the inaugural ChessKid Games hosted by Chess.com, accruing 20 straight victories and qualifying for the 2020 Junior Speed Chess Championship.

Niemann won the 2019 Foxwoods Open Blitz tournament with a perfect 10-0 score. Later at the 2019 US Junior Championships Niemann, then Connecticut's top junior player, tied for sixth place.

During the 2019 World Youth Championships Niemann occupied first place for the first 8 out of 11 rounds in the U16 Open with a performance rating of nearly 2600, ending up finishing 9th in a field of 78.

At the 2019 Grade Nationals, Niemann achieved a perfect 29–0 victory, achieving 12–0 in the Blitz Championship, 10–0 in the Bughouse Duo competition and finally 7–0 in the 11th Grade Championship.

In November 2019, Niemann competed in the 103rd Edward Lasker Memorial, tying for 1st place and achieving his second GM norm.

2020 
Niemann placed sixth at the American Continental Selection Open of the 2020 FIDE World Youth Championship.

He achieved his third and final GM norm at the Charlotte Chess Center & Scholastic Academy (CCCSA GM Norm Invitational) in October 2020, placing first. Originally, his third norm was meant to be achieved in the GM Berger Tournament during the 3rd Summer Chess Festival 2020 in Belgrade, which was cancelled due to the COVID-19 pandemic.

In November 2020, he won the 75th Annual Texas State and Amateur Championship, held in Fort Worth, Texas.

In December 2020, Niemann won the blitz competition at the VII Sunway Sitges International Chess Festival, and then surpassed the 2500 Elo threshold required to become a grandmaster.

2021 
In January 2021, he placed third at the Vergani Cap, held in Bassano del Grappa, Italy. In February, he won both the classical round robin (7/10) and blitz (10½/11) tournaments at the Winter Chess Festival "Paraćin 2021" in Serbia.

In April 2021, Niemann was featured on the front cover of Chess Life magazine, with the cover story documenting Niemann's journey to becoming a Grandmaster. He talked extensively about his journey to achieve the title in the Cover Stories with Chess Life Podcast released alongside the issue.

In July 2021, Niemann won the World Open held in Philadelphia after beating John Burke in tiebreaks. It was also in this tournament that Niemann surpassed the 2600 threshold with a draw against Ukrainian grandmaster Illia Nyzhnyk. Later that same month, he won the U.S. Junior Championship hosted by the Saint Louis Chess Club, which entitles him to compete in the 2022 U.S. Chess Championship.

In August 2021, Niemann finished second (8/9) behind GM Aleksandr Lenderman (8½/9) at the 121st U.S. Open Chess Championship in Cherry Hill, New Jersey.

At the FIDE Grand Swiss Tournament 2021 held in Latvia in October and November 2021, Niemann finished 52nd out of 108 players.

2022 
In March 2022, for the classical time control, Niemann broke into the chess top 100, ranked in 98th position. He was also the 12th ranked American.

In the FTX Crypto Cup, Niemann and his opponent Jan-Krzysztof Duda encountered technological problems involving the laptop Duda was using during the first round. Niemann later won with the black pieces in his second round game against reigning World Champion Magnus Carlsen. In the post-game interview after defeating Carlsen, Niemann said, "Chess speaks for itself" before walking off.  Niemann didn't win another match in the FTX Crypto tournament and finished last out of a field of eight with zero points.

In December 2022, Niemann placed second at the Chessable Sunway Sitges Open, after winning a tiebreak against Amin Tabatabaei. The tournament consolidated his rating as a 2700 player on the official FIDE ratings list for the first time.

PRO Chess League 
Niemann has competed in the PRO Chess League since 2017, competing for the Las Vegas Desert Rats (2017), Saint Louis Arch Bishops (2019, winning team) and Norway Gnomes (2020).

Cheating allegations

Sinquefield Cup incident 

In the third round of the 2022 Sinquefield Cup, Niemann defeated Carlsen with the black pieces, playing the Nimzo-Indian Defence. Niemann's live rating surpassed 2700 for the first time with this win. Carlsen withdrew from the Cup the next day, announcing his decision in a cryptic tweet containing a video of Portuguese football manager José Mourinho saying: "If I speak I'm in big trouble, and I don't want to be in big trouble." While Carlsen himself made no direct claims, his tweet along with the ramped up security measures at the tournament the day after his loss implied there was an accusation that Niemann was cheating , an accusation denied by Niemann and several commentators.  Niemann continued the tournament with 4 draws and 2 losses. 

Niemann faced Carlsen again in a much-anticipated game during the Julius Baer Generation Cup. Carlsen resigned the game after one move, further fueling the controversy. It has been characterized as the most serious cheating controversy for international chess since the Toiletgate incident in the World Chess Championship 2006. Many chess players and public figures have commented on the controversy, from former world champion Garry Kasparov to business magnate Elon Musk.

On September 26 2022, Carlsen accused Niemann of cheating in a statement posted on Twitter. Carlsen confirmed that he had considered withdrawing from the Sinquefield Cup due to Niemann's last-minute inclusion. Carlsen stated that he believed that Niemann cheated more often and recently than he had publicly admitted, and that Niemann's behaviour during their Sinquefield Cup game had convinced him to withdraw from the tournament. He stated that he was limited in what he could say openly without "explicit permission from Niemann", and that he would not play chess with Niemann in the future.

Responses and analysis 
The executive director of the St. Louis Chess Club, Tony Rich, said in a statement, "A player's decision to withdraw from a tournament is a personal decision, and we respect Magnus' choice." Rich later elaborated that no formal complaint was made in writing. Chief Arbiter Chris Bird published a statement affirming that there was "no indication that any player has been playing unfairly" during the tournament. Bird's statement did not address the reason to add additional security measures after Magnus' withdrawal.

Grandmaster Hikaru Nakamura accused Niemann of previously being suspended from Chess.com, the world's most popular chess platform, for cheating in online tournaments. Niemann later admitted, in a post-game interview, to having cheated in online games when he was 12 and 16 years old, but strongly denied ever cheating in an over-the-board game. Niemann revealed that Chess.com had suspended him again from the site and their events in light of the controversy. Chess.com's chief chess officer, Daniel Rensch, confirmed in a statement on Twitter that Niemann would remain suspended pending an explanation of his past cheating on the platform.

A statistical analysis of Niemann's games since 2020, including the Sinquefield Cup game between Carlsen and Niemann, by anti-cheating expert Ken Regan, found no evidence of cheating. In early October 2022, Chess.com released a report saying that he had likely cheated online more than 100 times, some as recently as 2020, at the age of 17.

Lawsuit 
On October 20, 2022, Niemann filed a $100 million defamation lawsuit against Carlsen, Chess.com, Hikaru Nakamura and others, regarding claims of his cheating. The case was filed in the District Court for the Eastern District of Missouri in St. Louis, where the Sinquefield Cup event took place. Yale law professor and Bloomberg columnist Stephen L. Carter wrote that the case would be "tough to win", based on legal precedents and the difficulty of proving actual malice under US law. As of December 7, 2022, all defendants except Play Magnus Group have filed motions to dismiss on various grounds including lack of jurisdiction and the state of Connecticut's anti-SLAPP laws.

Streaming career 
Niemann streams both online and over-the-board chess on Twitch, competing against fellow chess streamers such as GMs Andrew Tang, Daniel Naroditsky, Hikaru Nakamura, WFM Alexandra Botez and world chess champion Magnus Carlsen. In his streaming career, Niemann served as a coach and co-commentator for the second PogChamps online chess tournament, coaching participating Twitch streamers like xQc, Ludwig, Forsen and Hafu, as well as strongman and actor Hafþór Júlíus Björnsson.

Niemann first started streaming occasionally in the summer of 2018. He began streaming more regularly in the spring of 2019. After achieving moderate growth, his viewership skyrocketed in early 2020, during the COVID-19 pandemic. Streaming chess almost daily, Niemann's audience grew more than tenfold, coinciding with an overall boom in the chess category on Twitch.

Personal life 
While attending U.S. Chess School with fellow streamer and GM Andrew Tang, Niemann received training from GMs Joshua Friedel, Ben Finegold and Jacob Aagaard.

References

External links 

 
 
 
 

2003 births
Living people
American chess players
American sportspeople
Chess grandmasters
Sportspeople from California
Twitch (service) streamers
People from San Francisco
Sportspeople from San Francisco
American people of Danish descent
American people of Native Hawaiian descent